This list of prime ministers of Hungary lists each Prime Minister in order of term length.  This is based on the difference between dates; if counted by number of calendar days all the figures would be one greater.

Viktor Orbán, Kálmán Tisza, György Lázár and István Bethlen are the only persons to have served as Prime Minister for more than 10 years.  János Hadik served as Prime Minister for less than one day in 1918.

Rank by time in office

See also
 List of Prime Ministers of Hungary

Hungary